Minuscule 236 (in the Gregory-Aland numbering), ε 358 (Soden), is a Greek minuscule manuscript of the New Testament, on parchment. Paleographically it has been assigned to the 11th century. It has marginalia.

Description 

The codex contains the text of the four Gospels, on 256 parchment leaves (size ), with some lacunae (John 9:29-fin.). The text is written in one column per page, 20 lines per page. Seven leaves are paper. It is beautifully written.

There is also a division according to the Ammonian Sections.

Text 

The Greek text of the codex is a representative of the Byzantine text-type. Aland placed it in Category V.

According to the Claremont Profile Method it represents textual family Π171 in Luke 1, Luke 10, and Luke 20.

History 

According to Scrivener the manuscript was derived from codex 440. The manuscript was purchased in 1889 in Athens by J. Bevan Braithwaite. After coming to England it was held in London. It was examined and collated by W. C. Braithwaite.

The manuscript is currently housed in the Cadbury Research Library, University of Birmingham (Braithwaite Greek MS 3).

See also 

 List of New Testament minuscules
 Biblical manuscript
 Textual criticism

References

Further reading 

 J. Rendel Harris, On a New Manuscript of the Four Gospels, Haverford College Studies 4 (1890), 22-27.

Greek New Testament minuscules
11th-century biblical manuscripts